Dolneni Airport (Аеродром Долнени) is an airport in Prilep, North Macedonia.

See also
 Dolneni

External links

References

Buildings and structures in Prilep
Airports in North Macedonia